Calytrix merrelliana is a species of plant in the myrtle family Myrtaceae that is endemic to Western Australia.

It usually blooms between October and January producing purple-violet star-shaped flowers.

Found on undulating plains where the Wheatbelt adjoins the Goldfields-Esperance region of Western Australia between Kondinin and Coolgardie where it grows on sandy soils.

The species was first formally described as Lhotzkya violacea var. merrelliana  by the botanist Ferdinand von Mueller and R. Tate in 1896 in the work Botany. Phanerogams and Vascular Cryptogams. Transactions and proceedings and report, Royal Society of South Australia. It was reclassified in the genus Calytrix by Lyndley Craven in 1987 in the article A taxonomic revision of Calytrix Labill. (Myrtaceae) in the journal Brunonia.

References

merrelliana
Endemic flora of Western Australia
Rosids of Western Australia
Vulnerable flora of Australia
Plants described in 1987
Taxa named by Ferdinand von Mueller